The 2015 Silverstone GP2 Series round was a GP2 Series motor race held on July 4 and 5, 2015 at Silverstone Circuit in Silverstone, Britain. It was the fifth round of the 2015 GP2 Series. The race was used to support the 2015 British Grand Prix.

Classification

Qualifying
Sergey Sirotkin achieved his maiden pole with a time of 1:39.949, followed by Stoffel Vandoorne and Richie Stanaway. 

Notes
1. – Vișoiu received a three-place grid penalty after he was deemed to have impeded a competitor during the qualifying session.

Feature Race

Notes
1. – Rowland was given a 5-second penalty after having breached track limits several times during the race.
2. – Pic was given a 20-second penalty after being deemed to have collided with Jordan King on the final turn of the race.

Sprint Race

See also 
 2015 British Grand Prix
 2015 Silverstone GP3 Series round

References

External links 
 Official website of GP2 Series

Silverstone
GP2
Silverstone